Mike Seerey (born October 23, 1950 in St. Louis, Missouri) is a former U.S. soccer forward, and a two-time recipient of the Hermann Trophy as the outstanding collegiate soccer player of the year.  He played four seasons in the North American Soccer League and was a member of the U.S. soccer team at the 1972 Summer Olympics.

Youth
Seerey was a standout U.S. collegiate soccer player at St. Louis University where he starred for the school's men's soccer team from 1969 to 1972.  During his four years with the Billikens, the team won the NCAA championship three times.  In 1971, Seerey was a first team All American.  He also won the Hermann Trophy as the top collegiate player of the year.  Ironically, he was named the NCAA Tournament's Offensive MVP although this was the only year St. Louis did not win the championship during Seerey's four seasons.  Seerey repeated as the Hermann Trophy winner in 1972, making him the second two-time winner after fellow St. Louis teammate Al Trost.  However, he was not named to the All American list his senior year.  As of 2007, he is ranked fourth on the season points list at St. Louis with 55 in the 1971 season.

Olympics
In addition to playing collegiate soccer, Seerey was also a member of the 1972 U.S. Olympic soccer team.  He began playing with the Olympic team while in 1971 while still in college.  That year, the team went 3–2–2 in first-round qualifications.  In 1972, the U.S. qualified for its first Olympics in twelve years.  Seerey scored two goals in a 2–0 victory over Guatemala and another two goals in a 2–2 tie with Mexico.  The U.S. finished the second-round qualifications with a 2-1-3 record and a berth in the 1972 Summer Olympics.  Seerey started and played all 90 minutes in the first two U.S. games at the Olympics.  In the first game, the U.S. held Morocco scoreless in a 0–0 tie.  However, the next game brought the team back to Earth as Malaysia easily won 3–0.  The U.S. coach sent out his reserves for the last game against host West Germany and Seerey watched his teammates get humbled 7–0.

Professional
After the Olympics, Seerey turned pro with the Miami Toros of the North American Soccer League (NASL).  The Toros selected him in the first round (second overall) of the 1973 NASL draft.  He played 14 games and scored 3 goals, adding 4 assists.  The next year, he moved to the Saint Louis Stars, also of the NASL, where he played for the next three years.  He never found his scoring touch with the Stars and when he retired from the NASL after the 1976 season, he had only scored 1 goal in 43 games with that team.

External links
 1970 St. Louis University soccer team photo
 NASL stats

1950 births
Living people
American soccer players
Soccer players from St. Louis
Saint Louis University alumni
Hermann Trophy men's winners
Saint Louis Billikens men's soccer players
North American Soccer League (1968–1984) players
Miami Toros players
St. Louis Stars (soccer) players
Olympic soccer players of the United States
Footballers at the 1972 Summer Olympics
All-American men's college soccer players
Association football forwards